This is a list of roads designated B1. Roads entries are sorted in the countries alphabetical order.

 B1 road (Croatia), the designation of an expressway route in Croatia
 B1 road (Cyprus), a road in Cyprus
 B1 highway (Germany), a German road
 B1 road (Kenya), a road connected to the A1 road
 B1 road (Namibia), an important North-South road
 B1 road (Sri Lanka), a road connecting Akkaraipattu and Warapathanchenai 
 B1 road (United Kingdom) may refer to:
 B1 road (Northern Ireland), a road connecting Downpatrick and Ardglass 
 B1 road (United States of America) may refer to:
 B-1 corridor (Appalachian Development Highway System)

See also
 List of highways numbered 1, a disambiguation page
 List of A1 roads, a disambiguation page